The 1981 UCI Juniors Track World Championships were the seventh annual Junior World Championship for track cycling held in Grimma, Leipzig, West Germany in August 1981.

The Championships had five events for men only, Sprint, Points race, Individual pursuit, Team pursuit and 1 kilometre time trial.

Events

Medal table

References

UCI Juniors Track World Championships
1981 in track cycling
Track cycling
International cycle races hosted by Germany
International sports competitions hosted by West Germany
August 1981 sports events in Europe